Elections to Wigan Council were held on 1 May 1975, with one third of the council up for the election - although only 21 seats were contested, as Labour were unopposed in Ward 12, 21 and 24. Labour suffered six losses on the night - five to the Conservatives and one to the Liberals - with a gain from the sole Independent in Ward 23 as consolation. Overall turnout fell by nearly a quarter, to 27%.

Election result

This result had the following consequences for the total number of seats on the council after the elections:

Ward results

References

1975 English local elections
1975
1970s in Greater Manchester